JK may refer to:

People
Jay Kay (Jason Luís Cheetham, born 1969), English musician and lead singer of Jamiroquai
Jaykae (Janum Khan, born 1991), English rapper and actor
JK-47 (Jacob Paulson, born 1991/1992), Indigenous Australian rapper and musician
JK (rapper) or Tiger JK (Seo Jung-kwon, born 1974), South Korean-American rapper and record producer 
J.K. (singer) (Marta Simlat, born 1970), Polish model and singer
Jason King (presenter) (born 1975), British radio and TV presenter, part of JK and Joel
Jesper Kyd (born 1972), or JK, Danish video game composer
John McKay Jr. (John Kenneth McKay, born 1953), known as JK, American football player and attorney
Jordan Katembula (born 1978), known professionally as JK, Zambian singer
Joseph Kevin Bracken (1852–1904), known as J. K. Bracken, founder of the Gaelic Athletic Association
Jiddu Krishnamurti Indian Philosopher, Speaker and Writer
Jungkook (born 1997), or JK, South Korean singer
Juscelino Kubitschek (1902–1976), or JK, president of Brazil 1956–1961
JK Building in Belo Horizonte, Brazil
JK Memorial in Brasilia, Brazil
J. K. Dobbins (J'Kaylin Dobbins, born 1998), known as JK, American football player
J. K. Rowling, pen name of Joanne Rowling (born 1965), British author, producer, and philanthropist
J. K. Simmons (born 1955), American actor

Businesses and organisations
 J. K. Organisation, an Indian industrial conglomerate
 JK Lasers, a British laser manufacturer
 J. K. College, in Purulia district, West Bengal, India
 JK Public School, in Humhama, Srinagar, Jammu and Kashmir, India
 Spanair, a Spanish airline, IATA airline code JK

Other uses
 JK, an abbreviation of Jammu and Kashmir
 JK (TV series), a 2006 Brazilian series about Juscelino Kubitschek
 Jk antigen, or Kidd antigen system
 JK business, the practice of compensated dating with high school girls (joshi kōsei) in Japanese culture
 JK flip-flop, an electronic circuit 
 Jan Kjellström International Festival of Orienteering, or JK, a British orienteering competition
 Järnkaminerna, or JK, supporter club of Djurgårdens IF
 Junior kindergarten: See 
 JK, a Jeep Wrangler model 2007–2018

See also
 
 
 
 
 Just Kidding (disambiguation)